Ferdinand of Portugal may refer to:

Kings

 Ferdinand I of Portugal (1345–1383)
 Ferdinand II of Portugal (1819–1885), King Consort to Mary II of Portugal

Infantes

 Infante Fernando, Count of Flanders (1188–1233), son of Sancho I of Portugal
 Infante Fernando, Lord of Serpa (a. 1217–c. 1243), son of Afonso II of Portugal
 Infante Fernando of Portugal (1260) (1260–1262), son of Afonso III of Portugal
 Ferdinand of Portugal, Lord of Eça (c. 1378–?), son of Infante John, Duke of Valencia de Campos
 Fernando, the Saint Prince, Infante Fernando of Portugal, (1402–1443), son of John I of Portugal
 Ferdinand, Duke of Viseu (1433–1470), son of Edward of Portugal
 Infante Fernando, Duke of Guarda and Trancoso (1507–1534), son of Manuel I of Portugal
 Infante Fernando Maria Luís of Portugal (1846–1861), son of Maria II of Portugal and Ferdinand II of Portugal